The Liberal People's Party (DLF) was a classical liberal Norwegian political party created in 1992 by some of the members of the old Liberal People's Party.

History

During the 1990s, some of the Progress Party's members considered the party to have become less liberal than it had been in its earlier days. These members of the Progress Party then decided to join the DLF. The DLF then took increasingly more classically liberal viewpoints on most issues, emerging as a promoter of economic liberalism and laissez-faire capitalism. The party's politics states that the state should only protect individuals' rights through police, courts of law and a military service.

With meager showings in parliamentary elections, DLF's best result was achieved in the 2009 parliamentary election. Running in only three of 19 counties, they achieved a total of 350 votes—0.013% of the national vote, or about 0.1% in each of the counties in which they ran (Oslo, Hedmark and Rogaland). In the 2011 local elections they received 247 votes in Oslo, a doubling in the number of votes from the last local election.

In 2014 the youth wing Liberalistisk Ungdom (Liberal Youth) seceded from the DLF and joined the Capitalist Party as their youth wing.

In 2017 the party congress decided to shut down the party by the end of the year. Followers were recommended to join the Union for the Study of Objectivism and the Capitalist Party.

Objectives
DLF wanted to:
 Replace the parliamentary system and the monarchy with a constitutional republic.
 Abolish coercive taxes.
 Abolish all current restrictions regarding trade between Norway and other nations. Viewing the EU as a social democratic, redistributive and protectionist organization, they opposed Norwegian membership.
 Simplify laws, end bureaucracy, decriminalize victimless crimes, and so forth.
 Privatize roads, highways, railroads and other infrastructure, leaving their construction and upkeep to the free market.
 Abolish state financing of: special interest groups, business and industry, the agricultural and fishing sectors, the unemployed, and so forth.
 Abolish restrictions on immigration, provided that the above is accomplished beforehand.
 Abolish mandatory military service, instead relying on a fully professional defence force.
 Complete the separation of church and state.

Party leaders
 1992–1995 Tor Ingar Østerud
 1995–1997 Runar Henriksen
 1997–2001 Trond Johansen
 2001–2003 Arne Lidwin
 2003–2017 Vegard Martinsen

References

External links
  Det Liberale Folkepartiet (Liberal People's Party) official site
  Liberalistisk Ungdom (Liberal Youth) official site of the youth party

Classical liberal parties
Liberal parties in Norway
Libertarian parties
Political parties established in 1992
Political parties disestablished in 2017
1992 establishments in Norway